The 2005 First-Year Player Draft, Major League Baseball's annual amateur draft, was held on June 7 and 8.  It was conducted via conference call with representatives from each of the league's 30 teams. It is widely considered to be one of the best drafts in recent memory.

Source: Major League Baseball 2005 Official Draft Site

First round selections

Supplemental first round selections

 Did not sign with team

Compensation picks

Other notable players

Travis Wood, 2nd round, 60th overall by the Cincinnati Reds
Nolan Reimold, 2nd round, 61st overall by the Baltimore Orioles
Chase Headley, 2nd round, 66th overall by the San Diego Padres
Kevin Slowey, 2nd round, 73rd overall by the Minnesota Twins
Yunel Escobar, 2nd round, 75th overall by the Atlanta Braves
Nick Hundley, 2nd round, 76th overall by the San Diego Padres
Micah Owings, 3rd round, 83rd overall by the Arizona Diamondbacks
Brian Duensing, 3rd round, 84th overall by the Minnesota Twins
Jordan Schafer, 3rd round, 107th overall by the Atlanta Braves
Brett Gardner, 3rd round, 109th overall by the New York Yankees
Justin Maxwell, 4th round, 114th overall by the Washington Nationals
Jeremy Hellickson, 4th round, 118th overall by the Tampa Bay Devil Rays
Sam LeCure, 4th round, 122nd overall by the Cincinnati Reds
Chris Getz, 4th round, 125th overall by the Chicago White Sox
Gaby Sánchez, 4th round, 126th overall by the Florida Marlins
Brian Matusz, 4th round, 133rd overall by the Los Angeles Angels of Anaheim, but did not sign
Mitchell Boggs, 5th round, 170th overall by the St. Louis Cardinals
Lance Lynn, 6th round, 173rd overall by the Seattle Mariners, but did not sign
Marco Estrada, 6th round, 174th overall by the Washington Nationals
Doug Fister, 6th round, 199th overall by the New York Yankees, but did not sign
Michael Brantley, 7th round, 205th overall by the Milwaukee Brewers
Jon Niese, 7th round, 209th overall by the New York Mets
Will Venable, 7th round, 218th overall by the San Diego Padres
Jemile Weeks, 8th round, 235th overall by the Milwaukee Brewers, but did not sign
Steve Pearce, 8th round, 241st overall by the Pittsburgh Pirates
Clayton Richard, 8th round, 245th overall by the Chicago White Sox
Austin Jackson, 8th round, 259th overall by the New York Yankees
Bobby Parnell, 9th round, 269th overall by the New York Mets
Josh Outman, 10th round, 307th overall by the Philadelphia Phillies
Peter Bourjos, 10th round, 313th overall by the Los Angeles Angels of Anaheim
John Lannan, 11th round, 324th overall by the Washington Nationals
Josh Tomlin, 11th round, 338th overall by the San Diego Padres, but did not sign
Craig Stammen, 12th round, 354th overall by the Washington Nationals
Matt Joyce, 12th round, 360th overall by the Detroit Tigers
Josh Thole, 13th round, 389th overall by the New York Mets
Logan Ondrusek, 13th round, 392nd overall by the Cincinnati Reds
Casper Wells, 14th round, 420th overall by the Detroit Tigers
Pedro Alvarez, 14th round, 438th overall by the Boston Red Sox, but did not sign
Chris Carter, 15th round, 455th overall by the Chicago White Sox
Andrew Bailey, 16th round, 475th overall by the Milwaukee Brewers, but did not sign
David Hernandez, 16th round, 483rd overall by the Baltimore Orioles
Justin Smoak, 16th round, 491st overall by the Oakland Athletics, but did not sign
Yonder Alonso, 16th round, 495th overall by the Minnesota Twins, but did not sign
James Russell, 17th round, 503rd overall by the Seattle Mariners, but did not sign
Tommy Hunter, 18th round, 538th overall by the Tampa Bay Devil Rays, but did not sign
Desmond Jennings, 18th round, 544th overall by the Cleveland Indians, but did not sign
Ike Davis, 19th round, 568th overall by the Tampa Bay Devil Rays, but did not sign
Burke Badenhop, 19th round, 570th overall by the Detroit Tigers
Wade Miley, 20th round, 598th overall by the Tampa Bay Devil Rays, but did not sign
Vance Worley, 20th round, 607th overall by the Philadelphia Phillies, but did not sign
Andrew Cashner, 20th round, 617th overall by the Atlanta Braves, but did not sign
Logan Morrison, 22nd round, 666th overall by the Florida Marlins
Tommy Hanson, 22nd round, 677th overall by the Atlanta Braves
Jaime García, 22nd round, 680th overall by the St. Louis Cardinals
Jake Arrieta, 26th round, 775th overall by the Milwaukee Brewers, but did not sign
Tony Mansolino, 26th round, 781st overall by the Pittsburgh Pirates
Sergio Romo, 28th round, 852nd overall by the San Francisco Giants
Justin Turner, 29th round, 889th overall by the New York Yankees, but did not sign
Ryan Buchter, 33rd round, 984th overall by the Washington Nationals
Tyler Flowers, 33rd round, 1007th overall by the Atlanta Braves
Alex Avila, 34th round, 1020th overall by the Detroit Tigers, but did not sign
Brian Schlitter, 34th round, 1033rd overall by the Los Angeles Angels of Anaheim, but did not sign
Chris Davis, 35th round, 1063rd overall by the Los Angeles Angels of Anaheim, but did not sign
Brett Wallace, 42nd round, 1253rd overall by the Toronto Blue Jays, but did not sign
John Axford, 42nd round, 1259th overall by the Cincinnati Reds, but did not sign
Tim Lincecum, 42nd round, 1261st overall by the Cleveland Indians, but did not sign
Buster Posey, 50th round, 1496th overall by the Los Angeles Angels of Anaheim, but did not sign

Background
The Diamondbacks used the top overall pick on high school shortstop Justin Upton and thus made him and older brother, B.J., the highest selected pair of brothers in the history of the draft. The Devil Rays selected B.J. with the second overall pick of the 2002 draft. With the fourth overall pick, the Nationals chose one of Upton's AAU teammates, third baseman Ryan Zimmerman of the University of Virginia. Zimmerman and B.J. Upton played in the same AAU infield as New York Mets third baseman David Wright in their youth.

College third basemen accounted for three of the top five selections. A total of 13 pitchers went in the first round, 10 of whom came from the college ranks.

Rice pitcher Wade Townsend was the eighth overall pick in the first round for the second straight year. After failing to reach terms with the Orioles last year, Townsend re-entered the draft pool and was selected by Tampa Bay.

Stanford outfielder John Mayberry, the son of the longtime Major League first baseman of the same name, was drafted by the Rangers with the 19th overall pick.

Three 2005 first-round draft choices saw action before the conclusion of the Major League season. Atlanta's Joey Devine became the first Brave since Bob Horner in 1978 to appear in the Majors the same year he was drafted. Devine joined Ariel Prieto (OAK-1995), Chad Cordero (MON-2003) and Ryan Wagner (CIN-2003) as the only draftees of the last 15 years to reach the Majors before September 1 the same year. Zimmerman and Boston's Craig Hansen joined their Major League clubs in September 2005.

Ryan Braun was the first 2005 draftee to be selected to an All-Star Game. He was voted in as a starter in 2008. Jacoby Ellsbury and Clay Buchholz were the first 2005 draftees to win a World Series championship, although Buchholz, drafted in the supplemental first round, was never on the 2007 Red Sox postseason roster. Matt Garza was named MVP of the 2008 ALCS.

External links
MLB.com - Official MLB 2005 Draft Central page
MLB.com - 2005 First Round Picks
MLB.com - 2005 complete Draft Tracker (all rounds)
MLB.com - Draft History
Complete draft list from The Baseball Cube database

References

Major League Baseball draft
Draft
Major League Baseball draft